Meierhenry is a surname. Notable people with the surname include:

Judith Meierhenry (born 1944), American lawyer and judge
Mark V. Meierhenry (1944–2020), American attorney

See also
Meierhenrich